CROBEX is the official share index of the Zagreb Stock Exchange. As of August 2022, it includes stocks of 22 companies and is calculated continuously using the latest stock prices. It is measured using free float market capitalization, where the weight of each individual stock is limited to 10 percent.

History
It began to be published on 1 September 1997, and the base date is 1 July 1997, when its base value was 1,000 points.

For a long time, the Pliva stock was one of the main constituents of the index, before the company was sold and de-listed.

In October 2007, its value was around 5,400 points, an all-time high. By March 2009, the index dropped to 1,300 points. In the first half of 2011, it hovered around 2,200 points, falling to below 1,800 by the end of the year. In October 2016, the index broke 2,000 points, the highest level since March 2013.

Inclusion criteria
Stocks have to be traded in more than 75% of the total number of trade days in the selected time period in order to be included into CROBEX. The stock ranking is determined by weighing the stock's free float market capitalization as a proportion of the total, and its traffic as a proportion of the total share traffic in the six-month time period observed.

The index is revised every third Friday of March and September. The Index Commission can revise the index if the following extraordinary events happen:
 bankruptcy or liquidation of a company, increase or decrease in the base capital of a company, takeover, merger.
 removal of a stock listing
 long-term suspension of trade of a stock
There are also other circumstances related to the issuer or the stock that can affect the quality of the CROBEX index that can cause the Commission to revise the index.

A special revision can happen to include a new stock in the index in case the stock, in the first 30 days since its listing date, is traded in 100% of the total number of trade days, taking into account its free float market capitalization and share of traffic.

Composition
The index consists of the following 22 companies, as of the last update in August 2022:

See also
 CROBIS
 Zagreb Stock Exchange

References

External links
 Bloomberg page for CRO:IND
 CROBEX at the Zagreb Stock Exchange web site 
 CROBEX chart @ rast.hr 
 CROBEX Intraday Chart
 CROBEX and other regional indices at FIMA Securities

Financial services companies established in 1997
European stock market indices
Economy of Croatia
1997 introductions